The flora of Lebanon includes approximately 2,600 plant species. Situated on the eastern coast of the Mediterranean Basin, Lebanon is a reservoir of plant diversity and one of the world's biodiversity hotspots for conservation priorities. Endemic species constitute 12% of the Lebanese flora; 221 plant species are broad endemics and 90 are narrow endemics. Important Plant Areas (IPAs) featuring the country exceptional botanical richness were defined in 2018.

The natural vegetation of Lebanon has been threatened by overexploitation and fragmentation as a result of urban expansion, overgrazing, tourism and the impact of warfare. The cedar of Lebanon is the national symbol of the country; growing in the Lebanon Mountain range, these trees have been heavily harvested over the years for their valuable timber and few mature trees still remain. Nevertheless, Lebanon is more heavily wooded than most other countries in the region and pine, oak, fir, beech, cypress and juniper are to be found in the mountain areas although the Beqaa valley has little tree cover. Where timber has been extracted and woodland destroyed, scrub has taken over; in the Lebanon Mountain area this is mostly Ceratonia, oak and Pistacia, and in the Anti-Lebanon range the scrub is mostly Pistacia and wild almond. Other native trees such as the Lebanese wild apple, Judas tree and Syrian maple are being grown experimentally as a conservation strategy to see if they are amenable to container production.

The Al Shouf Cedar Nature Reserve was established in 1996 to preserve an old stand of cedar in central Lebanon. There are 24 kinds of tree in the reserve and 436 species of plant, including about 48 which are endemic to Lebanon, Syria and Turkey.

Apart from trees, there are a large number of flowering plants, ferns and mosses in the country. Many of the plants bloom after the winter rains, and the annual plants germinate at this time, grow, flower and set seed while the soil is moist enough to support them. One plant endemic to the country is the endangered Lebanon violet, found high up in rocky shrubland on the west side of Mount Lebanon.

A

Abies cilicica 
Acantholimon acerosum
Acantholimon antilibanoticum 
Acantholimon damassanum
Acantholimon echinus subsp. creticum
Acantholimon libanoticum 
Acantholimon lycaonicum
Acantholimon ulicinum
Acanthophyllum kurdicum
Acanthus hirsutus subsp. syriacus
Acer cinerascentiforme 
Acer hyrcanum subsp. tauricolum
Acer monspessulanum subsp. microphyllum
Acer obtusifolium 
Achillea aleppica
Achillea arabica
Achillea distans subsp. tanacetifolia
Achillea falcata 
Achillea fragrantissima
Achillea kotschyi 
Achillea maritima
Achillea membranacea
Achillea millefolium 
Achillea santolinoides subsp. wilhelmsii
Achnatherum bromoides
Achnatherum miliaceum
Adenocarpus complicatus 
Adiantum capillus-veneris 
Adonis aestivalis 
Adonis aestivalis subsp. squarrosa
Adonis aleppica
Adonis annua var. cupaniana
Adonis dentata subsp. persica
Adonis flammea
Adonis microcarpa
Adonis microcarpa subsp. cretica
Adonis palaestina
Aegilops bicornis
Aegilops caudata
Aegilops columnaris 
Aegilops crassa var. crassa
Aegilops cylindrica
Aegilops geniculata
Aegilops juvenalis
Aegilops kotschyi
Aegilops longissima
Aegilops lorentii
Aegilops neglecta
Aegilops peregrina 
Aegilops searsii
Aegilops speltoides subsp. ligustica
Aegilops speltoides subsp. speltoides
Aegilops tauschii
Aegilops triuncialis
Aegilops umbellulata
Aegilops vavilovii
Aegilops ventricosa
Aegilotriticum loretii
Aegilotriticum triticoides
Aeluropus lagopoides
Aeluropus littoralis
Aetheorrhiza bulbosa
Aethionema coridifolium 
Agrimonia eupatoria
Agrimonia repens
Agrostemma githago 
Agrostis castellana
Agrostis olympica
Agrostis stolonifera

Aira elegantissima
Ajuga chamaepitys subsp.  rechingeri
Ajuga chamaepitys subsp. chia 
Ajuga chamaepitys subsp. glareosa
Ajuga chamaepitys subsp. laevigata
Ajuga chamaepitys subsp. libanotica
Ajuga chamaepitys subsp. mesogitana
Ajuga chamaepitys subsp. palaestina
Ajuga chamaepitys subsp. tridactylites
Ajuga chasmophila
Ajuga orientalis
Ajuga vestita
Alcea acaulis
Alcea apterocarpa 
Alcea damascena 
Alcea digitata 
Alcea dissecta 
Alcea kurdica subsp.  coelesyriaca 
Alcea setosa 
Alchemilla diademata 
Alhagi maurorum
Alisma lanceolatum 
Alisma plantago-aquatica
Alkanna kotschyana
Alkanna leiocarpa 
Alkanna maleolens 
Alkanna orientalis 
Alkanna prasinophylla 
Alkanna strigosa 
Alkanna tinctoria 
Allium affine 
Allium ampeloprasum 
Allium ampeloprasum var. leucanthum 
Allium ascalonicum
Allium asclepiadeum 
Allium atroviolaceum
Allium azaurenum
Allium basalticum
Allium bassitense
Allium birkinshawii
Allium calyptratum
Allium carmeli 
Allium cassium 
Allium chloranthum 
Allium chloranthum var. montanum 
Allium chrysantherum
Allium colchicifolium
Allium curtum subsp. Palaestinum
Allium damascenum
Allium daninianum
Allium deserti-syriaci
Allium dictyoprasum
Allium drusorum
Allium dumetorum
Allium erdelii
Allium feinbergii 
Allium hamrinense
Allium hermoneum
Allium karyeteini
Allium kharputense
Allium libani 
Allium longisepalum
Allium lycaonicum
Allium machmelianum 
Allium macrochaetum
Allium meronense
Allium multibulbosum
Allium myrianthum 
Allium neapolitanum
Allium nigrum 
Allium noeanum
Allium olivieri
Allium opacum
Allium orientale 
Allium pallens
Allium paniculatum 
Allium phanerantherum 
Allium pseudocalyptratum 
Allium pseudophanerantherum
Allium pseudostamineum
Allium qasyunense
Allium rothii
Allium rotundum 
Allium rupicola 
Allium sannineum 
Allium sativum 
Allium schergianum
Allium schubertii
Allium scorodoprasum
Allium sindjarense
Allium sphaerocephalon subsp. arvense
Allium sphaerocephalon subsp. sphaerocephalon
Allium sprengeri
Allium stamineum 
Allium subhirsutum
Allium trachycoleum
Allium trifoliatum 
Allium truncatum
Allium vineale 
Allium wiedemannianum
Allium zebdanense
Alnus orientalis 
Alopecurus arundinaceus
Alopecurus gerardii
Alopecurus myosuroides
Alopecurus textilis
Alopecurus utriculatus
Alopecurus vaginatus
Althaea bertramii 
Althaea cannabina
Althaea officinalis
Alyssum baumgartnerianum 
Alyssum condensatum 
Alyssum contemptum 
Alyssum libanoticum 
Alyssum mouradicum 
Alyssum murale 
Alyssum repens 
Alyssum stribryni
Amaranthus blitoides
Amaranthus hybridus
Amaranthus retroflexus 
Amelanchier ovalis 
Ammi majus 
Ammochloa palaestina
Ammophila arenaria
Ammophila arenaria subsp. australis
Anacamptis collina 
Anacamptis coriophora
Anacamptis laxiflora 
Anacamptis morio subsp. syriaca
Anacamptis papilionacea 
Anacamptis pyramidalis 
Anacamptis sancta
Anacyclus clavatus
Anacyclus nigellifolius 
Anacyclus radiatus 
Anagallis arvensis
Anagallis foemina
Anarrhinum forskaohlii
Anchonium billardieri
Anchusa azurea
Anchusa hybrida
Anchusa strigosa 
Andrachne telephioides 
Androcymbium palaestinum
Andropogon distachyos
Androsace maxima
Androsace multiscapa
Androsace villosa 
Andryala dentata
Andryala integrifolia
Anemone blanda 
Anemone coronaria var. phoenicia 
Anemone coronaria var.cyanea 
Anethum graveolens
Aneura pinguis
Anisosciadium tenuifolium subsp. sibthorpianum
Ankyropetalum coelesyriacum
Ankyropetalum gypsophiloides
Anogramma leptophylla 
Anthemis breviradiata
Anthemis chia 
Anthemis cotula 
Anthemis cretica 
Anthemis cretica subsp. cassia var. discoidea 
Anthemis didymaea 
Anthemis haussknechtii
Anthemis hebronica
Anthemis hermonsis
Anthemis hyalina
Anthemis patentissima
Anthemis pauciloba
Anthemis pseudocotula
Anthemis rascheyana
Anthemis scariosa
Anthemis secundiramea
Anthemis tripolitana
Anthoceros punctatus
Anthoxanthum odoratum
Anthriscus lamprocarpa
Antinoria insularis
Apera interrupta
Aphanes arvensis
Arabidopsis thaliana
Arabis aucheri 
Arabis caucasica 
Arabis nova 
Arabis verna 
Arbutus andrachne
Arbutus unedo
Arceuthobium oxycedri
Arctium minus subsp. pubens
Arenaria deflexa 
Arenaria deflexa subsp. pubescens
Arenaria fragillima
Arenaria leptoclados 
Arenaria libanotica 
Arenaria pamphylica
Argentina anserina
Arisarum vulgare subsp. vulgare
Arisarum vulgare var. veslingii 
Aristida adscensionis
Aristolochia billardieri 
Aristolochia bottae 
Aristolochia maurorum 
Aristolochia paecilantha 
Aristolochia parviflora 
Aristolochia pontica
Aristolochia sempervirens (Syn. Aristolochia altissima)
Armeria undulata
Arrhenatherum elatius
Arrhenatherum kotschyi 
Arrhenatherum palaestinum
Artedia squamata
Artemisia arborescens
Artemisia monosperma
Artemisia scoparia
Artemisia verlotiorum
Arthrocnemum macrostachyum 
Arum dioscoridis var. cyprium 
Arum dioscoridis var. philistaeum 
Arum dioscoridis var. syriacum 
Arum elongatum 
Arum gratum 
Arum hygrophilum 
Arum palaestinum
Arum rupicola var. rupicola (Arum conophalloides Kotschy ex Schott)
Arum rupicola var. virescens
Arundo donax
Arundo micrantha
Asparagus acutifolius
Asparagus aphyllus
Asparagus aphyllus subsp. orientalis
Asparagus filifolius
Asparagus horridus
Asparagus trichophyllus
Asperugo procumbens
Asperula arvensis
Asperula bargyli
Asperula breviflora
Asperula cymulosa
Asperula glareosa
Asperula glomerata
Asperula libanotica
Asperula orientalis
Asperula semanensis
Asperula setosa
Asperula stricta
Asphodeline baytopiae
Asphodeline brevicaulis 
Asphodeline brevicaulis subsp. druzorum
Asphodeline brevicaulis var.edumea 
Asphodeline damascena 
Asphodeline globifera
Asphodeline lutea
Asphodeline recurva
Asphodelus fistulosus
Asphodelus ramosus subsp. ramosus
Asphodelus tenuifolius
Asphodelus viscidulus
Asplenium bourgaei 
Asplenium ceterach
Asplenium lepidum
Asplenium lepidum subsp. haussknechtii
Asplenium onopteris
Asplenium onopteris 
Asplenium ruta-muraria 
Asplenium sagittatum
Asplenium sagittatum 
Asplenium scolopendrium
Asplenium scolopendrium 
Asplenium trichomanes 
Asteriscus aquaticus
Asterolinon linum-stellatum
Astomaea seselifolium
Astragalus aduncus
Astragalus aleppicus 
Astragalus angulosus 
Astragalus angulosus subsp. heliopolitanus 
Astragalus angustifolius 
Astragalus angustifolius subsp. postianus
Astragalus annularis 
Astragalus antilibani
Astragalus argyrothamnos
Astragalus asterias
Astragalus barbatus 
Astragalus berytheus 
Astragalus bethlehemiticus 
Astragalus boeticus 
Astragalus brachystachys
Astragalus campylorhynchus
Astragalus caprinus subsp. caprinus
Astragalus cedreti 
Astragalus cephalotes 
Astragalus cilicius 
Astragalus coluteoides 
Astragalus crenatus
Astragalus cruentiflorus 
Astragalus drusorum 
Astragalus echinatus
Astragalus echinops
Astragalus echinus 
Astragalus ehdenensis 
Astragalus ehrenbergii 
Astragalus emarginatus
Astragalus epiglottis 
Astragalus eriocarpus 
Astragalus gossypinus
Astragalus gummifer
Astragalus guttatus 
Astragalus hamosus 
Astragalus hispidus 
Astragalus kotschyanus 
Astragalus kurnet-es-saudae
Astragalus lanatus
Astragalus macrocarpus subsp. macrocarpus
Astragalus macrocephalus subsp. cucullaris (Astragalus cuccularis) 
Astragalus mollis
Astragalus nummularius subsp. trichopterus
Astragalus oleaefolius
Astragalus palaestinus 
Astragalus pelecinus
Astragalus pinetorum 
Astragalus psilodontius 
Astragalus roussaeanus 
Astragalus schizopterus 
Astragalus spinosus 
Astragalus suberosus 
Astragalus trachoniticus 
Astragalus tribuloides 
Astragalus trifoliolatus 
Astragalus triradiatus 
Astragalus zachlensis
Astrodaucus orientalis
Asyneuma rigidum 
Asyneuma virgatum 
Atadinus fallax
Atadinus libanoticus
Athyrium filix-femina 
Atocion reuterianum
Atractylis cancellata
Atraphaxis billardierei
Atraphaxis spinosa
Atriplex halimus 
Atriplex lasiantha 
Atriplex portulacoides
Atriplex prostrata subsp. calotheca
Aubrieta libanotica
Avena barbata
Avena clauda
Avena eriantha
Avena fatua
Avena sativa
Avena sterilis subsp. ludoviciana
Avena sterilis subsp. sterilis

B

Baldellia ranunculoides 
Ballota antilibanotica 
Ballota byblensis
Ballota damascena
Ballota nigra
Ballota nigra subsp. ruderalis 
Ballota saxatilis 
Ballota undulata
Barbarea macrocarpa 
 Barbilophozia barbata
Bassia monticola 
Bazzania flaccida
Beckmannia eruciformis
Bellardia trixago
Bellardia viscosa
Bellevalia densiflora
Bellevalia douinii
Bellevalia flexuosa 
Bellevalia hermonis 
Bellevalia longipes
Bellevalia macrobotrys 
Bellevalia mosheovii
Bellevalia nivalis 
Bellevalia palmyrensis
Bellevalia stepporum var. edumea
Bellevalia stepporum var. stepporum
Bellevalia trifoliata
Bellevalia warburgii
Bellis annua 
Bellis perennis 
Bellis sylvestris 
Berberis libanotica 
Berula erecta
Beta vulgaris 
Biarum aleppicum
Biarum angustatum
Biarum auraniticum
Biarum bovei 
Biarum carduchorum
Biarum crispulum
Biarum pyrami
Biarum syriacum
Bidens pilosa (introduced)
Biebersteinia multifida
Bifora testiculata
Bilacunaria boissieri
Bilacunaria microcarpa
Biscutella ciliata 
Biscutella didyma subsp. apula
Blackstonia acuminata
Blackstonia perfoliata 
Blechnum spicant 
 Blepharostoma trichophyllum
  Blysmus compressus 
Bolanthus filicaulis 
Bolanthus frankenioides 
Bolanthus hirsutus
Bolboschoenus glaucus (syn.Scirpus tuberosus)
Bolboschoenus maritimus subsp. maritimus
Bongardia chrysogonum
Borago officinalis
Bothriochloa ischaemum
Brachiaria eruciformis
Brachiaria mutica
Brachypodium distachyon
Brachypodium pinnatum
Brachypodium retusum
Brachypodium sylvaticum
Briza humilis
Briza maxima 
Briza minor
Bromus alopecuros subsp. alopecuros
Bromus alopecuros subsp. caroli-henrici
Bromus arenarius 
Bromus arvensis 
Bromus bikfayensis
Bromus brachystachys
Bromus catharticus
Bromus chrysopogon
Bromus danthoniae
Bromus diandrus
Bromus erectus 
Bromus fasciculatus 
Bromus hordeaceus
Bromus intermedius
Bromus japonicus subsp. anatolicus
Bromus japonicus subsp. japonicus
Bromus lanceolatus
Bromus madritensis 
Bromus pseudobrachystachys
Bromus pumilio
Bromus rigidus 
Bromus rubens
Bromus scoparius
Bromus secalinus 
Bromus squarrosus 
Bromus sterilis 
Bromus syriacus 
Bromus tectorum 
Bromus tomentellus 
Brunnera orientalis 
Bryonia cretica
Bryonia multiflora 
Bryonia syriaca 
Bryonia cretica
Bufonia ephedrina var. minor
Bufonia paniculata
Bufonia virgata
Buglossoides arvensis
Buglossoides incrassata
Buglossoides sibthorpiana
Buglossoides tenuiflora
Bungea trifida
Bunium elegans
Bunium ferulaceum
Bunium hermonis
Bunium paucifolium 
Bunium pestolazzae 
Bupleurum brevicaule 
Bupleurum cappadocicum 
Bupleurum dichotomum 
Bupleurum falcatum 
Bupleurum fruticosum 
Bupleurum gerardii 
Bupleurum gracile 
Bupleurum intermedium 
Bupleurum kurdicum 
Bupleurum lancifolium 
Bupleurum libanoticum 
Bupleurum nodiflorum 
Bupleurum odontites 
Bupleurum papillosum 
Bupleurum postii 
Butomus umbellatus

C

Cachrys boissieri
Cakile aegyptia 
Cakile maritima 
Calamagrostis epigejos 
Calamagrostis pseudophragmites 
Calamintha origanifolia 
Calamintha vulgaris 
 Calendula arvensis
Calendula palaestina
Calicotome villosa 
Callipeltis cucullaris 
Callipeltis factorovskyi 
  Callitriche mouterdei
 Callitriche nafiolskyi
 Callitriche truncata subsp. occidentalis
 Calypogeia azurea
 Calypogeia fissa
 Calypogeia muelleriana
 Calystegia sepium
Campanula antilibanotica 
Campanula buseri 
Campanula camptoclada 
Campanula coriacea 
Campanula cymbalaria 
Campanula damascena 
Campanula erinus 
Campanula euclasta 
Campanula fastigiata 
Campanula flaccidula 
Campanula hierosolymitana 
Campanula kotschyana 
Campanula peregrina 
Campanula phrygia 
Campanula postii 
Campanula propinqua 
Campanula rapunculus 
Campanula rapunculus subsp. Lambertiana
Campanula rapunculus var. spiciformis 
Campanula retrorsa 
Campanula reuteriana 
Campanula sidoniensis 
Campanula stellaris 
Campanula stricta 
Campanula stricta var. libanotica
Campanula strigosa 
Campanula sulphurea 
Campanula trachelium subsp. trachelium
Campanula trichopoda 
Capparis spinosa 
Capparis spinosa var. canescens
Capparis spinosa var. parviflora
Cardamine graeca 
Cardamine uliginosa
Cardaria chalepensis
Cardopatium corymbosum
Carduus acicularis 
Carduus argentatus 
 Carduus pycnocephalus
 Carduus pycnocephalus subsp. albidus
 Carduus pycnocephalus subsp.  cinereus
 Carduus pycnocephalus subsp. pycnocephalus
Carex acuta 
Carex diluta subsp. diluta (syn. Carex extensa)
Carex distans subsp. distans
Carex divisa 
Carex divulsa 
Carex echinata subsp. echinata
Carex flacca 
Carex flacca subsp. erythrostachys
Carex leersii 
Carex mediterranea 
Carex otrubae 
Carex pallescens 
Carex pendula 
Carex pseudocyperus var. pseudocyperus
Carex remota subsp. remota
Carex riparia subsp. riparia
Carex sylvatica subsp. sylvatica
 Carlina curetum subsp. orientalis
 Carlina curetum var. montana
 Carlina frigida subsp. renatae
Carlina involucrata
 Carlina lanata 
 Carlina libanotica
Carthamus caeruleus
Carthamus glaucus
Carthamus glaucus subsp. glandulosus
Carthamus glaucus subsp. glaucus
Carthamus nitidus
Carthamus persicus
Carthamus tenuis
Carthamus tenuis subsp. gracillimus
Carthamus tenuis subsp. tenuis
Carthamus tinctorius
Carum polyphyllum
Castanea sativa 
Catabrosa aquatica 
Catananche lutea
Catapodium marinum 
Catapodium rigidum var. majus
Caucalis daucoides 
Caucalis platycarpos
Cedrus libani var. libani
Celtis australis (ميس)
Celtis australis subsp. australis
Celtis planchoniana
Cenchrus ciliaris 
Cenchrus echinatus 
Centaurea ainetensis 
Centaurea ammocyanus
Centaurea babylonica
Centaurea behen
Centaurea benedicta
Centaurea calcitrapa 
Centaurea cheirolopha
Centaurea cyanoides
Centaurea cyanus
Centaurea damascena
Centaurea drabifolia 
Centaurea dumulosa
Centaurea eryngioides 
Centaurea heterocarpa 
Centaurea hololeuca 
Centaurea hyalolepis 
Centaurea iberica 
Centaurea iberica subsp. hermonis
Centaurea iberica subsp. iberica
Centaurea iberica subsp.  meryonis
Centaurea longispina
Centaurea microcnicus
Centaurea mouterdei 
Centaurea pallescens 
Centaurea onopordifolia
Centaurea postii
Centaurea procurrens
Centaurea reducta
Centaurea rigida
Centaurea simulans 
Centaurea solstitialis
Centaurea speciosa 
Centaurea triumfetti
Centaurea verutum
Centaurea virgata
Centaurium erythraea 
Centaurium erythraea var.  erythraea
Centaurium erythraea var. laxum
Centaurium maritimum
Centaurium pulchellum
Centaurium spicatum
Centaurium tenuiflorum 
Centranthus longiflorus 
Centranthus longiflorus var. latifolius
Centropodia forsskalii subsp. forsskalii
Cephalanthera damasonium 
Cephalanthera longifolia 
Cephalanthera rubra 
Cephalaria balansae
Cephalaria cedrorum
Cephalaria joppensis
Cephalaria joppica 
Cephalaria kesruanica 
Cephalaria setosa
Cephalaria stellipilis
Cephalaria syriaca
Cephalorrhynchus tuberosus 
Cephalozia bicuspidata
Cephaloziella baumgartneri
Cephaloziella calyculata
Cephaloziella divaricata
Cephaloziella stellulifera
Cephaloziella turneri
Cerastium anomalum 
Cerastium brachypetalum subsp. roeseri
Cerastium cerastoides
Cerastium comatum
Cerastium dichotomum 
Cerastium dichotomum subsp. inflatum
Cerastium dubium
Cerastium fragillimum
Cerastium glomeratum
Cerastium inflatum 
Cerastium kotschyi
Cerastium semidecandrum

Ceratocapnos turbinata
Ceratocephala falcata
Ceratocephala falcata subsp. falcata
Ceratocephala falcata subsp. incurva
Ceratonia siliqua 
Ceratophyllum demersum 
Cercis siliquastrum 
Cerinthe major
Cerinthe minor subsp. auriculata
Cerinthe minor subsp. minor
Cerinthe palaestina
Chaenorhinum calycinum
Chaenorhinum minus 
Chaerophyllum aurantiacum 
Chaerophyllum libanoticum
Chaerophyllum macrospermum
Chaerophyllum syriacum 
Chamaeleon comosus
Chardinia orientalis 
Chardinia xeranthimoides
Cheilanthes catanensis 
Cheilanthes fragrans 
Cheilanthes maderensis
Cheilanthes pteridioides
Chenopodium botrys 
Chenopodium foliosum
Chenopodium opulifolium 
Chenopodium rubrum 
Cherleria labillardieri
Chiliadenus iphionoides
Chloris gayana 
Chloris virgata 
Chondrilla juncea 
Chrozophora tinctoria 
Chrysopogon gryllus 
Cicendia filiformis
Cicer incisum 
Cicer incisum var. libanoticum
Cicerbita mulgedioides 
Cichorium endivia
Cichorium intybus
Cichorium pumilum
Cirsium creticum
Cirsium creticum subsp. gaillardotii
Cirsium diacantha 
Cirsium leucocephalum subsp. hermonis
Cirsium libanoticum 
Cirsium phyllocephalum 
Cirsium vulgare 
Cistus creticus subsp. creticus
Cistus creticus subsp. eriocephalus
Cistus salviifolius 
Citrullus colocynthis
Cladanthus mixtus
Cladium mariscus subsp. mariscus
Clematis cirrhosa
Clematis flammula 
Clematis vitalba
Cleome iberica
Clevea hyalina
Clevea spathysii
Clinopodium betulifolium 
Clinopodium graveolens subsp. raveolens
Clinopodium insulare 
Clinopodium libanoticum 
Clinopodium menthifolium subsp. enthifolium
Clinopodium nummulariifolium 
Clinopodium serpyllifolium 
Clinopodium serpyllifolium subsp. barbatum
Clinopodium serpyllifolium subsp. brachycalyx 
Clinopodium vulgare 
Clinopodium vulgare subsp. orientale
Clypeola jonthlaspi 
Colchicum antilibanoticum 
Colchicum cilicicum 
Colchicum crocifolium 
Colchicum decaisnei 
Colchicum dolichantherum 
Colchicum fasciculare 
Colchicumiae 
Colchicum hierosolymitanum 
Colchicum persicum 
Colchicum polyphyllum 
Colchicum ritchii 
Colchicum schimperi 
Colchicum soboliferum 
Colchicum stevenii 
Colchicum szovitsii 
Colchicum szovitsii subsp. brachyphyllum (syn. Colchicum libanoticum)
Colchicum tunicatum 
Coleostephus myconis
Colutea cilicica 
Coluteocarpus vesicarius 
Conium maculatum 
Conocephalum conicum
Consolida ajacis
Consolida coelesyriaca
Consolida flava
Consolida hohenackeri
Consolida incana
Consolida orientalis
Consolida pusilla
Consolida rigida 
Consolida scleroclada
Convolvulus arvensis 
Convolvulus betonicifolius
Convolvulus betonicifolius
Convolvulus cantabrica
Convolvulus coelesyriacus
Convolvulus dorycnium
Convolvulus elegantissimus
Convolvulus fatmensis
Convolvulus galaticus
Convolvulus libanoticus
Convolvulus lineatus
Convolvulus palaestinus
Convolvulus pentapetaloides
Convolvulus scammonia 
Convolvulus secundus 
Convolvulus siculus
Convolvulus stachydifolius
Convolvulus tricolor
Corchorus olitorius
Coriandrum sativum
Coriandrum tordylium
Cornucopiae alopecuroides 
Cornucopiae cucullatum 
Cornus mas 
Cornus sanguinea 
Cornus sanguinea subsp. cilicica 
Coronilla emeroides 

Corrigiola litoralis
Corrigiola palaestina
Corsinia coriandrina
Corydalis erdelii
Corydalis rutifolia 
Corydalis solida 
Corydalis solida var. brachyloba
Corydalis triternata
Corynephorus deschampsioides 
Corynephorus divaricatus 
Cosentinia vellea subsp. vellea
Cota altissima
Cota amblyolepis
Cota coelopoda
Cota lyonnetioides
Cota palaestina
Cota samuelssonii
Cota tinctoria
Cota wiedemanniana
Cotoneaster nummularius 
Cotyledon libanotica 
Cousinia aleppica 
Cousinia libanotica 
Cousinia pestalozzae 
Cousinia postiana 
Cousinia ramosissima 
Crassula alata 
Crataegus azarolus 
Crataegus monogyna
Crataegus sinaica
Crepis aculeata 
Crepis aspera 
Crepis foetida subsp. foetida
Crepis foetida subsp. glandulosa
Crepis foetida subsp. rhoeadifoliaa
Crepis foetida subsp. foetida
Crepis hierosolymitana 
Crepis libanotica 
Crepis palaestina 
Crepis pterothecoides 
Crepis pulchra 
Crepis reuteriana 
Crepis reuteriana subsp. eigiana
Crepis robertioides 
Crepis sancta subsp. nemausensis
Crepis sancta subsp. obovata
Crepis sancta subsp. sancta
Crepis syriaca
Crepis zacintha
Crithmum maritimum 
Crithopsis delileana 
Crocodylium crocodylium
Crocus aleppicus 
Crocus cancellatus subsp. cancellatus
Crocus cancellatus subsp. damascenus
Crocus graveolens 
Crocus hermoneus subsp. Hermoneus
Crocus hyemalis 
Crocus kotschyanus subsp. kotschyanus
Crocus ochroleucus 
Crocus pallasii subsp. dispathaceus 
Crocus pallasii subsp. haussknechtii
Crocus pallasii subsp. pallasii 
Crocus pallasii subsp. turcinus 
Crocus vitellinus 
Crucianella aegyptiaca 
Crucianella chlorostachys 
Crucianella ciliata 
Crucianella imbricata 
Crucianella latifolia 
Crucianella macrostachya 
Crucianella membranacea 
Crucianella parviflora 
Cruciata articulata 
Cruciata pedemontana var. pedemontana
Cruciata taurica subsp. mesopotamica 
Cruciata taurica subsp. taurica
Crupina crupinastrum 
Crypsis aculeata 
Crypsis acuminata subsp. acuminata
Crypsis acuminata subsp. borszczowii 
Crypsis alopecuroides 
Crypsis factorovskyi 
Crypsis schoenoides 
Crypsis vaginiflora 
Cupressus sempervirens 
Cuscuta approximata
Cuscuta brevistyla 
Cuscuta epithymum
Cuscuta europaea
Cuscuta kotschyana
Cuscuta monogyna 
Cuscuta planiflora 
Cuscuta palaestina subsp. balansae 
Cuscuta palaestina subsp. palaestina 
Cuscuta planiflora
Cutandia dichotoma 
Cutandia maritima 
Cutandia memphitica 
Cyclamen coum 
Cyclamen libanoticum 
Cyclotrichium origanifolium
Cyclamen persicum
Cyclotrichium origanifolium 
Cymbopogon jwarancusa 
Cymbopogon jwarancusa subsp. olivieri 
Cynanchum acutum
Cynara auranitica
Cynara scolymus
Cynara syriaca
Cynodon dactylon 
Cynoglossum circinnatum
Cynoglossum creticum 
Cynoglossum lamprocarpum
Cynoglossum lithospermifolium
Cynoglossum montanum
Cynoglossum nebrodense 
Cynoglossum rugulosum
Cynoglossum schlumbergeri
Cynoglossum stamineum
Cynoglossum circinnatum
Cynomorium coccineum
Cynosurus coloratus 
Cynosurus echinatus 
Cynosurus elegans 
Cyperus alopecuroides 
Cyperus articulatus 
Cyperus capitatus 
Cyperus dives 
Cyperus fuscus 
Cyperus glaber 
Cyperus laevigatus subsp. distachyos 
Cyperus laevigatus subsp. laevigatus
Cyperus longus subsp. badius 
Cyperus longus subsp. longus
Cyperus michelianus 
Cyperus michelianus subsp. pygmaeus
Cyperus rotundus 
Cystopteris fragilis 
Cytinus hypocistis
Cytisopsis doryeniifolia 
Cytisus syriacus

D

Dactylis glomerata subsp. glomerata
Dactylis glomerata subsp. hispanica
Dactyloctenium aegyptium 
Dactylorhiza balabaniana 
Dactylorhiza iberica
Dactylorhiza osmanica var. osmanica
Dactylorhiza romana subsp. romana
Dactylorhiza saccifera subsp. gervasiana
Dactylorhiza saccifera subsp. saccifera
Damasonium bourgaei 
Danae racemosa 
Daphne libanotica
Daphne oleoides 
Daphne sericea
Datura stramonium (introduced)
Daucus aureus 
Daucus broteri 
Daucus carota
Daucus guttatus 
Daucus littoralis 
Daucus pumilus
Daucus setulosus
Delphinium fissum subsp. ithaburense
Delphinium hohenackeri
Delphinium peregrinum
Delphinium staphisagria
Delphinium virgatum
Desmazeria philistaea 
Desmostachya bipinnata 
Dianthus cyri
Dianthus karami
Dianthus libanotis 
Dianthus micranthus
Dianthus monadelphus subsp. judaicus
Dianthus monadelphus subsp. monadelphus
Dianthus orientalis
Dianthus pendulus 
Dianthus strictus 
Dianthus strictus subsp. multipunctatus
Dianthus strictus var. subenervis
Dianthus strictus var. sublaevis
Dianthus strictus var. velutinus
Dianthus tripunctatus 
Dichanthium annulatum var. annulatum
Dichoropetalum aureum
Dichoropetalum depauperatum
Dichoropetalum junceum
Digitalis ferruginea 
Digitaria sanguinalis 
Dinebra retroflexa var. retroflexa
Dioscorea communis (syn. Tamus communis)
Dioscorea orientalis 
Diplachne fusca subsp. fusca
Diplophyllum taxifolium
Dipsacus laciniatus 
Dipsacus sylvestris 
Dittrichia graveolens
Dittrichia viscosa subsp. angustifolia 
Doronicum orientale 
Draba nuda
Draba oxycarpa
Drabopsis verna 
Drimia aphylla 
Drimia fugax 
Drimia maritima ?
Drimia undata 
Drosera rotundifolia 
Dryopteris aculeata 
Dryopteris pallida subsp. libanotica
Dryopteris pallida subsp.  pallida
Dysphania botrys

E

 Ecballium elaterium
Echinaria capitata 
Echinochloa colona 
Echinochloa crus-galli 
Echinodorus ranunculoides 
Echinops adenocaulos
Echinops gaillardotii
Echinops polyceras 
Echinops spinosissimus subsp. macrolepis 
Echinops spinosissimus subsp. spinosissimus 
Echinops viscosus 
Echium angustifolium 
Echium glomeratum
Echium judaeum
Echium plantagineum
Elaeagnus angustifolia زيزفون سوري 
Elaeosticta meifolia
Eleocharis geniculata 
Eleocharis macrantha 
Eleocharis palustris subsp. palustris
Eleusine indica 
Elymus libanoticus 
Elymus panormitanus 
Elymus repens subsp. repens
Elymus tauri var. tauri
Emex spinosa 
Eminium intortum 
Eminium rauwolffii var. kotschyi 
Eminium rauwolffii var. rauwolffii
Eminium spiculatum 
Enarthrocarpus arcuatus 
Ephedra alata subsp. alata
Ephedra aphylla 
Ephedra foeminea 
Ephedra major subsp. major
Ephedra transitoria 
Epilobium angustifolium
Epilobium hirsutum 
Epilobium lanceolatum 
Epilobium minutiflorum 
Epilobium montanum 
Epilobium parviflorum
Epilobium tetragonum subsp. tetragonum
Epilobium tetragonum subsp.  tournefortii 
Epipactis condensata 
Epipactis helleborine subsp. helleborine
Epipactis veratrifolia 
Equisetum palustre 
Equisetum ramosissimum 
Equisetum telmateia 
Eragrostis barrelieri 
Eragrostis cilianensis 
Eragrostis collina 
Eragrostis japonica 
Eragrostis minor 
Eragrostis pilosa 
Eremogone minuartioides
Eremogone picta
Eremopoa capillaris 
Eremopoa persica 
Eremopyrum bonaepartis 
Eremopyrum distans 
Eremopyrum orientale 
Eremostachys laciniata 
Eremurus cappadocicus 
Eremurus spectabilis 
Eremurus wallii 
Erica manipuliflora 
Erica sicula subsp. libanotica
Erigeron libanoticus
Eriolobus trilobatus (Malus trilobata)
Erodium acaule (geraniacae)
Erodium botrys 
Erodium cicutarium 
Erodium gaillardotii 
Erodium glaucophyllum
Erodium gruinum
Erodium laciniatum
Erodium malacoides
Erodium moschatum
Erodium neuradifolium
Erodium romanum 
Erodium trichomanifolium
Erophaca baetica subsp. baetica
Erophaca baetica subsp. orientalis
Erophila gilgiana 
Erophila setulosa 
Ervum ervoides 
Ervum lenticula 
Eryngium billardieri
Eryngium bourgatii subsp. heldreichii
Eryngium campestre 
Eryngium creticum 
Eryngium desertorum
Eryngium falcatum
Eryngium glomeratum 
Eryngium maritimum 
Eryngium pusillum 
Erysimum goniocaulon 
Erysimum libanoticum 
Erysimum oleifolium 
Erysimum repandum 
Erysimum scabrum 
Erysimum verrucosum
Eudianthe coeli-rosa
Eudianthe laeta
Eunomia oppositifolia
Eupatorium cannabinum 
Euphorbia aleppica 
Euphorbia altissima var. altissima
Euphorbia altissima var. glabrescens
Euphorbia antilibanotica 
Euphorbia apios 
Euphorbia arguta 
Euphorbia aulacosperma 
Euphorbia berythea 
Euphorbia cassia subsp. cassia
Euphorbia caudiculosa 
Euphorbia chaborasia 
Euphorbia chamaepeplus 
Euphorbia chamaesyce 
Euphorbia cheiradenia 
Euphorbia cuspidata 
Euphorbia dendroides 
Euphorbia densa subsp. densa
Euphorbia denticulata 
Euphorbia erinacea 
Euphorbia eriophora 
Euphorbia erubescens 
Euphorbia esula subsp. esula
Euphorbia exigua subsp. exigua
Euphorbia falcata subsp.falcata
Euphorbia falcata var. galilaea 
Euphorbia fistulosa 
Euphorbia forskaolii 
Euphorbia gaillardotii 
Euphorbia granulata 
Euphorbia grossheimii 
Euphorbia haussknechtii 
Euphorbia helioscopia subsp. helioscopia
Euphorbia herniariifolia var. herniariifolia
Euphorbia hierosolymitana var. hierosolymitana
Euphorbia hirsuta 
Euphorbia kotschyana 
Euphorbia macroclada 
Euphorbia microsphaera 
Euphorbia nutans 
Euphorbia obovata 
Euphorbia oxyodonta 
Euphorbia paralias 
Euphorbia peplis 
Euphorbia peplus var. minima
Euphorbia peplus var. peplus
Euphorbia petiolata var. petiolata
Euphorbia petiolata var. postii
Euphorbia petrophila 
Euphorbia phymatosperma subsp. phymatosperma
Euphorbia physocaulos 
Euphorbia promecocarpa 
Euphorbia reuteriana 
Euphorbia rigida 
Euphorbia sintenisii 
Euphorbia szovitsii var. szovitsii
Euphorbia terracina 
Euphorbia valerianifolia 
Exoacantha heterophylla

F

Fagonia olivieri
Faidherbia albida
Falcaria vulgaris
Fallopia convolvulus
Ferula cassii
Ferula biverticillata
Ferula communis
Ferula elaeochytris
Ferula hermonis
Ferula tingitana
Ferulago frigida 
Ferulago syriaca 
Ferulago trachycarpa 
Festuca arundinacea 
Festuca callieri 
Festuca circummediterranea 
Festuca jeanpertii 
Festuca ovina 
Festuca pinifolia 
Festuca pratensis 
Fibigia clypeata subsp. eriocarpa
Fibigia eriocarpa old name See Fibigia clyptea
Ficaria ficarioides 
Ficaria grandiflora 
Ficaria verna subsp.  ficariiformis
Ficaria verna subsp. verna
Ficus carica 
Filago anatolica 
Filago arvensis 
Filago contracta 
Filago davisii 
Filago eriocephala 
Filago eriosphaera 
Filago gallica 
Filago griffithii 
Filago palaestina 
Filago pygmaea 
Filago pyramidata 
Filago vulgaris 
Fimbristylis autumnalis 
Fimbristylis bisumbellata 
Fimbristylis ferruginea subsp. ferruginea
Fimbristylis ferruginea subsp. sieberiana
Fimbristylis turkestanica 
Foeniculum vulgare (fennel)
Fontanesia phillyreoides 
Fossombronia angulosa
Fossombronia caespitiformis
Fossombronia pusilla
Fragaria vesca (wild strawberry)
Frangula alnus subsp. pontica
Frankenia hispida 
Frankenia pulverulenta
Fraxinus angustifolia 
Fraxinus angustifolia subsp. syriaca 
Fraxinus ornus subsp. ornus
Fritillaria acmopetala subsp. acmopetala
Fritillaria alfredae subsp. alfredae
Fritillaria alfredae subsp. platyptera
Fritillaria crassifolia subsp. crassifolia
Fritillaria elwesii 
Fritillaria frankiorum 
Fritillaria hermonis 
Fritillaria latakiensis 
Fritillaria persica (syn. Fritillaria libanotica )
Fritillaria pinardii subsp. pinardii
Frullania dilatata
Frullania tamarisci
Fumana arabica 
Fumana procumbens
Fumana scoparia
Fumana thymifolia
Fumaria asepala
Fumaria bastardii
Fumaria capreolata
Fumaria cilicica
Fumaria densiflora 
Fumaria gaillardotii 
Fumaria judaica
Fumaria kralikii
Fumaria macrocarpa
Fumaria officinalis
Fumaria parviflora
Fuirena pubescens var. pubescens

G

Gagea bohemica 
Gagea chlorantha 
Gagea circumplexa 
Gagea dayana 
Gagea foliosa 
Gagea gageoides 
Gagea granatellii 
Gagea kneissea 
Gagea libanotica 
Gagea liotardii 
Gagea luteoides 
Gagea micrantha 
Gagea peduncularis 
Gagea reticulata 
Gagea rigida 
Gagea villosa var. hermonis
Gagea villosa var. villosa
Galanthus fosteri 
Galium adhaerens 
Galium album 
Galium album subsp. amani 
Galium album subsp. prusense 
Galium aparine 
Galium bracteatum 
Galium canum subsp. canum
Galium cassium 
Galium chaetopodum 
Galium consanguineum 
Galium divaricatum 
Galium ehrenbergii 
Galium elongatum 
Galium ghilanicum 
Galium hierochuntinum 
Galium hierosolymitanum 
Galium humifusum 
Galium incanum subsp. elatius 
Galium incanum subsp. incanum
Galium incanum subsp. libanoticum
Galium judaicum 
Galium jungermannioides 
Galium libanoticum 
Galium murale 
Galium nigricans 
Galium penicillatum 
Galium peplidifolium 
Galium pestalozzae 
Galium pisiferum 
Galium rivale 
Galium rotundifolium 
Galium samuelssonii var. pseudadhaerens 
Galium samuelssonii var. samuelssonii
Galium schlumbergeri 
Galium setaceum 
Galium shepardii 
Galium tenuissimum 
Galium tenuissimum f. tenuissimum
Galium tenuissimum f. trichophorum
Galium thiebautii 
Galium tricornutum 
Galium verrucosum 
Galium verticillatum 
Galium verum subsp. glabrescens 
Galium verum subsp. verum
Garhadiolus hedypnois
Garidella unguicularis
Gastridium phleoides 
Gastridium ventricosum 
Gaudinia fragilis 
Genista libanotica 
Geranium libani 
Geranium libanoticum 
Geranium molle 
Geranium purpureum 
Geranium rotundifolium 
Geranium tuberosum 
Geropogon hybridus
Geum heterocarpum
Geum urbanum 
Gladiolus antakiensis 
Gladiolus atroviolaceus (syn. G. aleppicus)
Gladiolus imbricatus 
Gladiolus italicus 
Glaucium corniculatum
Glaucium flavum 
Glaucium grandiflorum
Glaucium leiocarpum 
Glaucium oxylobum
Glebionis coronaria (edible)
Glebionis segetum
Glinus lotoides
Glochidotheca foeniculacea
Glyceria notata 
Gnaphalium uliginosum
Gomphocarpus fruticosus (introduced?)
Gongylanthus ericetorum
Groenlandia densa 
Gundelia tournefortii
Gymnarrhena micrantha 
Gymnogramma leptophylla
Gynandriris sisyrinchium
Gypsophila antari
Gypsophila arabica
Gypsophila damascena
Gypsophila libanotica 
Gypsophila mollis
Gypsophila perfoliata
Gypsophila pilosa
Gypsophila ruscifolia
Gypsophila viscosa

H

Hainardia cylindrica 
Habrosia spinuliflora
Halimione portulacoides 
Halimium umbellatum 
Haplophyllum armenum
Haplophyllum buxbaumii
Haplophyllum fruticulosum
Hedera caucasigena 
Hedypnois rhagadioloides
Hedypnois rhagadioloides subsp. rhagadioloides  
Hedypnois rhagadioloides subsp. tubaeformis 
Heleocharis macrantha
Heleocharis palustris 
Heleochloa schoenoides 
Helianthemum aegyptiacum
Helianthemum kotschyanum
Helianthemum lasiocarpum
Helianthemum ledifolium subsp. campylopus
Helianthemum ledifolium 
Helianthemum lippii
Helianthemum nummularium subsp. tomentosum
Helianthemum nummularium 
Helianthemum ovatum
Helianthemum salicifolium 
Helianthemum stipulatum
Helianthemum syriacum
Helianthemum vulgare 
Helichrysum armenium
Helichrysum luteoalbum
Helichrysum pallasii 
Helichrysum plicatum 
Helichrysum pygmaeum
Helichrysum sanguineum 
Helichrysum stoechas subsp. barrelieri
Helichrysum virgineum
Helichrysum virgineum 
Helictotrichon convolutum 
Helictotrichon pratense subsp. pratense
Heliotropium bovei
Heliotropium hirsutissimum 
Heliotropium lasiocarpum
Heliotropium myosotoides
Heliotropium rotundifolium
Heliotropium schweinfurthii
Heliotropium supinum 
Helminthotheca echioides
Helosciadium nodiflorum
Hemarthria altissima 
Henrardia persica 
Henrardia pubescens 
Heptaptera anisoptera
Heracleum humile
Herniaria cinerea
Herniaria glabra
Herniaria hirsuta 
Herniaria incana
Hesperis kotschyana
Hesperis pendula 
Heteranthelium piliferum 
Heteropogon contortus 
Hibiscus trionum
Hieracium bauhinii
Hieracium kneissaeum 
Hieracium schmidtii subsp. labillardierei
Hieracium schmidtii subsp. libanoticum 
Himantoglossum caprinum 
Himantoglossum comperianum
Himantogolossum affine 
Hippocrepis multisiliquosa 
Hippocrepis unisiliquosa 
Hirtellina lobelii
Holcus annuus subsp. annuus
Holcus lanatus 
Holosteum glutinosum
Holosteum umbellatum
Hordeum bulbosum 
Hordeum distichon 
Hordeum marinum subsp. gussoneanum
Hordeum marinum subsp. marinum
Hordeum murinum subsp. glaucum 
Hordeum murinum subsp. leporinum
Hordeum murinum subsp. murinum
Hordeum secalinum 
Hordeum spontaneum 
Hordeum vulgare 
Hormuzakia aggregata
Hyacinthella nervosa 
Hyacinthus orientalis subsp. orientalis
Hymenocarpus circinatus 
Hyoscyamus albus
Hyoscyamus aureus 
Hyoscyamus niger 
Hyoscyamus pojarkovae
Hyoscyamus reticulates 
Hyoseris scabra
Hyparrhenia hirta 
Hypecoum imberbe
Hypecoum imberbe 
Hypericum amblysepalum
Hypericum confertum
Hypericum hircinum subsp. majus 
Hypericum lanuginosum
Hypericum lanuginosum
Hypericum libanoticum
Hypericum libanoticum 
Hypericum lydium
Hypericum montbretii
Hypericum nanum
Hypericum pallens
Hypericum pallens
Hypericum perforatum
Hypericum perforatum 
Hypericum russeggeri
Hypericum scabrum
Hypericum tetrapterum
Hypericum thymifolium
Hypericum thymifolium 
Hypericum triquetrifolium
Hypericum venustum
Hypochaeris achyrophorus
Hypochaeris glabra

I

Ifloga spicatasubsp. spicata
Ifloga spicatasubsp. labillardierei
Imperata cylindrica 
Inula conyzae
Inula salicina 
Inula verbascifolia subsp. heterolepis
Ipomoea cairica
Ipomoea imperati
Iris albicans 
Iris antilibanotica 
Iris assadiana 
Iris atrofusca 
Iris aucheri 
Iris auranitica 
Iris basaltica 
Iris bismarckiana 
Iris bostrensis 
Iris caucasica subsp. caucasica
Iris cedreti 
Iris damascena 
Iris gatesii 
Iris germanica 
Iris grant-duffii 
Iris hermona 
Iris histrio 
Iris kirkwoodiae subsp. kirkwoodiae
Iris lortetii var. lortetii
Iris masia 
Iris nusairiensis 
Iris palaestina 
Iris pallida subsp. pallida
Iris persica 
Iris postii 
Iris pseudacorus (LF)
Iris susiana (syn.  Iris sofarana)
Iris swensoniana 
Iris unguicularis 
Iris unguicularis var. syriaca 
Iris vartanii 
Iris westii 
Iris yebrudii subsp. edgecombii 
Iris yebrudii subsp. yebrudii
Isatis lusitanica 
Isoetes histrix
Isoetes libanotica
Isolepis cernua var. cernua
Isolepis setacea 
Ixiolirion tataricum var. tataricum

J

Jacobaea aquatica
Jacobaea erratica
Jacobaea mouterdei (endemic)
Jasminum fruticans
Johrenia dichotoma
Johrenia tortuosa
Juncus capitatus 
Juncus effusus
Juncus littoralis
Juncus rechingeri
Juncus rigidus
Juncus sphaerocarpus
Juncus subnodulosus
Juncus subulatus
Jungermannia atrovirens
Juniperus communis var. communis
Juniperus communis var. saxatilis
Juniperus drupacea 
Juniperus excelsa
Juniperus foetidissima 
Juniperus oxycedrus
Juniperus phoenicea
Jurinea staehelinae

K

Kickxia aegyptiaca subsp. palaestina
Kickxia commutata subsp. commutata
Kickxia commutata subsp. graeca
Kickxia elatine subsp. crinita
Kickxia lanigera
Kickxia spuria subsp. integrifolia
Kickxia spuria subsp. spuria
Kitaibelia balansae
Klasea cerinthifolia
Klasea mouterdei
Klasea pusilla (syn. Serratula pusilla)
Koeleria nitidula
Koelpinia linearis
Krubera peregrina

L

Lactuca microcephala
Lactuca orientalis
Lactuca saligna
Lactuca sativa
Lactuca serriola 
Lactuca triquetra
Lactuca tuberosa
Lactuca viminea
Lagoecia cuminoides
Lagonychium farctum
Lagurus ovatus 
Lallemantia iberica 
Lallemantia royleana 
Lamarckia aurea 
Lamium amplexicaule subsp. amplexicaule
Lamium amplexicaule var. allepicum 
Lamium amplexicaule var. bornmuelleri
Lamium amplexicaule var. incisum 
Lamium eriocephalum 
Lamium garganicum subsp. garganicum
Lamium garganicum subsp. striatum
Lamium garganicum var. microphyllum
Lamium macrodon 
Lamium maculatum 
Lamium moschatum 
Lamium moschatum subsp. micranthuma
Lamium orientale 
Lamium purpureum var. ehrenbergii
Lamium purpureum var. incisum
Lamium purpureum var. purpureum
Lappula barbata
Lappula sessiliflora
Lappula sinaica
Lappula spinocarpos
Lappula szovitsiana
Lapsana communis subsp. communis
Lapsana communis subsp. pisidica
Lapsana communis subsp. ramosissima
Laser trilobum
Lathyrus aphaca 
Lathyrus digitatus 
Lathyrus hierosolymitanus 
Lathyrus libani 
Lathyrus nissolia 
Lathyrus setifolius 
Lathyrus variabilis
Launaea fragilis
Laurus nobilis 
Lavandula stoechas subsp. stoechas
Leersia hexandra 
Lavatera punctata
Lavatera trimestris 
Lecokia cretica
Legousia falcata 
Legousia hybrida 
Legousia pentagonia 
Legousia speculum-veneris 
Leiotulus secacul
Lemna gibba 
Lemna minor 
Leontice leontopetalum subsp. armeniaca
Leontice leontopetalum subsp. leontopetalum
Leontodon asperrimus 
Leontodon libanoticus 
Leontodon oxylepis
Leontodon tuberosus
Leopoldia bicolor 
Leopoldia comosa 
Leopoldia longipes subsp. longipes
Leopoldia maritima 
Leopoldia tenuiflora 
Lepidium latifolium 
Lilium candidum 
Limbarda crithmoides subsp.longifolia
Limodorum abortivum var. abortivum
Limonium angustifolium
Limonium cedrorum
Limonium graecum
Limonium mouterdei
Limonium narbonense
Limonium postii
Limonium sieberi 
Limonium sinuatum
Limonium virgatum
Linaria antilibanotica
Linaria chalepensis 
Linaria damascena
Linaria joppensis
Linaria kurdica subsp. aucheri 
Linaria micrantha
Linaria pelisseriana
Linaria simplex
Linum aroanium
Linum bienne 
Linum carnosulum 
Linum corymbulosum
Linum gallicum 
Linum mucronatum subsp. armenum
Linum mucronatum subsp. orientale
Linum mucronatum subsp. syriacum 
Linum mucronatumsubsp. mucronatum
Linum nodiflorum
Linum peyronii
Linum pubescens
Linum strictum
Linum toxicum
Linum trigynum
Linum usitatissimum
Liochlaena lanceolata
Lisaea strigosa
Lithospermum officinale
Lloydia rubroviridis 
Loliolum subulatum 
Lolium multiflorum 
Lolium perenne 
Lolium persicum 
Lolium rigidum 
Lolium temulentum 
Lomelosia argentea
Lomelosia aucheri
Lomelosia brachiata
Lomelosia calocephala
Lomelosia divaricata
Lomelosia olivieri
Lomelosia palestina
Lomelosia prolifera
Lonicera arborea
Lonicera caucasica subsp. orientalis
Lonicera etrusca
Lonicera etrusca 
Lonicera nummulariifolia 
Lophocolea bidentata
Lophocolea heterophylla
Lotus angustissimus 
Lotus corniculatus var. alpinus 
Lotus cytisoides 
Lotus gebelia 
Lotus gebelia subsp. libanoticus 
Lotus tenuis 
Ludwigia adscendens subsp. diffusa
Ludwigia palustris
Lunularia cruciata
Lupinus digitatus 
Lupinus hirsutus 
Lycium barbarum
Lycium chinense
Lycium europaeum
Lycochloa avenacea 
Lycopus europaeus 
Lysimachia dubia
Lythrum hyssopifolia 
Lythrum junceum
Lythrum salicaria 
Lythrum tribracteatum
Lythrum volgense

M

Malcolmia maritima 
Malva aegyptia 
Malva hirsuta 
Malva multiflora 
Malva neglecta 
Malva nicaeensis 
Malva oxyloba 
Malva parviflora 
Malva punctata 
Malva sylvestris 
Malva trimestris 
Malvella sherardiana 
Mandragora autumnalis 
Mannia androgyna 
Mannia californica 
Marchantia paleacea 
Marchantia polymorpha 
Marchantia quadrata 
Marrubium cuneatum 
Marrubium globosum 
Marrubium globosum subsp. libanoticum 
Marrubium hierapolitanum 
Marrubium vulgare 
Matthiola crassifolia 
Matthiola crassifolia var flaviflora 
Matthiola tricuspidata 
Matricaria aurea 
Matricaria chamomilla 
Medicago lupulina 
Medicago minima 
Medicago orbicularis 
Medicago polymorpha 
Medicago sativa 
Melanortocarya obtusifolia 
Melica capillaris 
Melica ciliata 
Melica eligulata 
Melica haussknechtii 
Melica persica 
Melica uniflora 
Melilotus indicus 
Melilotus officinalis 
Melissa officinalis 
Melissa officinalis subsp. inodora
Mentha aquatica 
Mentha longifolia subsp. longifolia
Mentha longifolia subsp. typhoides
Mentha piperita 
Mentha pulegium 
Mentha spicata subsp. condensata
Mentha spicata subsp. spicata
Mercurialis annua 
Mercurialis ovata 
Mericarpaea ciliata 
Mesembryanthemum nodiflorum 
Mesoptychia turbinata 
Metzgeria furcata 
Michauxia campanuloides 
Michauxia nuda 
Micromeria cremnophila 
Micromeria cremnophila subsp. amana
Micromeria graeca subsp. graeca
Micromeria graeca subsp. laxiflora
Micromeria juliana 
Micromeria myrtifolia 
Micromeria nervosa 
Micropus supinus 
Milium pedicellare 
Milium vernale 
Minuartia decipiens subsp. damascena
Minuartia decipiens subsp. decipiens
Minuartia globulosa 
Minuartia hamata
Minuartia innominata 
Minuartia intermedia 
Minuartia libanotica 
Minuartia meyeri 
Minuartia parvulorum 
Misopates orontium 
Molinia caerulea 
Moluccella laevis 
Moluccella spinosa 
Moenchia erecta subsp. octandra
Montia minor 
Moraea sisyrinchium 
Morina persica 
Muscari commutatum 
Muscari hermonense 
Muscari neglectum 
Muscari parviflorum
Myopordon pulchellum 
Myosotis laxa subsp. caespitosa 
Myosotis lithospermifolia
Myosotis ramosissima subsp. ramosissima
Myosotis ramosissima subsp. uncata
Myosotis refracta 
Myosotis sicula 
Myosotis stricta 
Myosurus minimus 
Myriocoleopsis minutissima 
Myriophyllum spicatum 
Myriophyllum verticillatum 
Myrtus communis

N

Najas graminea var. graminea
Najas marina 
Najas marina var. intermedia 
Najas minor 
Narcissus serotinus 
Narcissus tazetta subsp. tazetta
Nardia compressa 
Nasturtium officinale 
Neotinea maculata 
Neotinea tridentata 
Nepeta campylantha 
Nepeta cataria 
Nepeta cilicica 
Nepeta congesta 
Nepeta curviflora 
Nepeta flavida 
Nepeta glomerata 
Nepeta italica subsp. italica
Nepeta italica subsp. rigidula
Nepeta nuda 
Nepeta nuda subsp. albiflora 
Nepeta pabotii 
Nepeta stricta 
Nepeta trachonitica 
Nerium oleander 
Neurada procumbens 
Nigella arvensis subsp. arvensis 
Nigella arvensis subsp. palaestina 
Nigella ciliaris 
Nigella deserti 
Nigella oxypetala subsp. latisecta 
Nigella oxypetala subsp. oxypetala 
Nonea echioides 
Nonea melanocarpa 
Noaea mucronata 
Noccaea microstyla 
Nonea obtusifolia 
Notobasis syriaca 
Nuphar luteum

O

Odontites aucheri 
Odontites hispidulus
Odontites luteus
Oenanthe aquatica
Oenanthe fistulosa
Oenanthe pimpinelloides
Oenanthe silaifolia
Oldenlandia corymbosa 
Oldenlandia corymbosa var. caespitosa
Olea europaea subsp. europaea
Onobrychis cornuta 
Ononis adenotricha 
Ononis natrix 
Ononis pusilla 
Ononis reclinata var. mollis 
Ononis spinosa subsp. leiosperma
Onopordum blancheanum
Onopordum carduiforme
Onopordum cynarocephalum
Onopordum floccosum
Onopordum heteracanthum
Onopordum syriacum
Onopordum tauricum
Onosma caerulescens
Onosma frutescens 
Onosma montanum
Onosma rascheyanum
Onosma roussaei
Onosma sericeum 
Onosma xanthotrichum
Ophioglossum azoricum
Ophioglossum lusitanicum 
Ophioglossum vulgatum
Ophrys apifera 
Ophrys argolica 
Ophrys argolica subsp. lucis
Ophrys cilicica 
Ophrys fuciflora subsp. bornmuelleri
Ophrys fuciflora subsp. fuciflora
Ophrys fuciflora subsp. oblita
Ophrys fuciflora var. ziyaretiana
Ophrys fusca subsp. cinereophila
Ophrys fusca subsp. fusca
Ophrys fusca subsp. iricolor
Ophrys lutea 
Ophrys lutea subsp. galilaea
Ophrys omegaifera 
Ophrys omegaifera subsp. israelitica
Ophrys reinholdii 
Ophrys reinholdii subsp. antiochiana
Ophrys schulzei 
Ophrys scolopax 
Ophrys speculum subsp. speculum
Ophrys sphegodes 
Ophrys sphegodes subsp. mammosa
Ophrys umbilicata subsp. flavomarginata
Ophrys umbilicata subsp. latakiana
Ophrys umbilicata subsp. umbilicata
Orchis anatolica 
Orchis anthropophora 
Orchis galilaea 
Orchis italica 
Orchis mascula subsp. mascula
Orchis patens var. asiatica 
Orchis punctulata 
Orchis simia subsp. simia
Orchis spitzelii subsp. spitzelii
Origanum adonidis 
Origanum barbarae 
Origanum bargyli 
Origanum cordifolium 
Origanum ehrenbergii 
Origanum laevigatum 
Origanum libanoticum 
Origanum pabotii 
Origanum syriacum subsp. bevanii
Origanum syriacum subsp. syriacum
Orlaya daucoides 
Ornithogalum apiculatum 
Ornithogalum arabicum 
Ornithogalum cuspidatum 
Ornithogalum fuscescens 
Ornithogalum lanceolatum 
Ornithogalum libanoticum 
Ornithogalum montanum 
Ornithogalum narbonense 
Ornithogalum neurostegium subsp. eigii 
Ornithogalum neurostegium subsp. neurostegium
Ornithogalum sphaerocarpum 
Ornithogalum umbellatum 
Orobanche camptolepis
Orobanche cernua
Orobanche crenata
Orobanche grisebachii
Orobanche hermonis
Orobanche minor
Orobanche pubescens
Osmunda regalis 
Osmunda regalis var. plumieri 
Ostrya carpinifolia 
Osyris alba 
Oxalis pes-caprae (introduced, noxious)

P

Paeonia kesrouanensis
Paeonia mascula subsp. mascula
Paeonia mascula subsp. orientalis
Paliurus spina-christi
Pallenis spinosa subsp. asteroidea
Pallenis spinosa subsp. spinosa
Pancratium maritimum 
Pancratium sickenbergeri 
Panicum capillare 
Panicum maximum 
Panicum miliaceum 
Panicum repens 
Panicum turgidum 
Papaver argemone subsp. belangeri 
Papaver dubium
Papaver hybridum
Papaver libanoticum
Papaver postii
Papaver rhoeas subsp. polytrichum
Papaver rhoeas subsp. rhoeas 
Papaver syriacum
Papaver umbonatum 
Paragymnopteris marantae
Parapholis incurva 
Parapholis marginata 
Parentucellia latifolia 
Parietaria alsinifolia
Parietaria cretica
Parietaria judaica
Parietaria lusitanica
Paronychia argentea
Paronychia echinulata
Paronychia kurdica
Paronychia macrosepala
Paronychia mesopotamica
Paronychia palaestina
Paspalidium geminatum 
Paspalum dilatatum 
Paspalum distichum 
Pastinaca sativa (parsnip)
Pedicularis comosa subsp. campestris
Pellia epiphylla
Peltaria angustifolia 
Pennisetum divisum 
Pennisetum glaucum 
Pennisetum orientale 
Pennisetum setaceum 
Periploca graeca
Persicaria amphibia
Persicaria hydropiper
Persicaria lapathifolia
Persicaria maculosa
Persicaria salicifolia
Petrorhagia cretica
Petrorhagia dubia
Petrosedum amplexicaule subsp. tenuifolium
Peucedanum autumnale
Phacelurus digitatus 
Phaeoceros laevis
Phagnalon kotschyi
Phagnalon linifolium
Phagnalon rupestre 
Phalaris aquatica 
Phalaris arundinacea 
Phalaris brachystachys 
Phalaris coerulescens 
Phalaris minor 
Phalaris paradoxa 
Phelipanche aegyptiaca
Phelipanche astragali
Phelipanche lavandulacea
Phelipanche libanotica
Phelipanche mutelii
Phelipanche nana
Phelipanche ramosa
Phelipanche schultzii
Phillyrea latifolia 
Phleum alpinum 
Phleum arenarium 
Phleum bertolonii 
Phleum boissieri 
Phleum exaratum 
Phleum montanum 
Phleum pratense 
Phleum subulatum 
Phlomis brachyodon subsp. brachyodon
Phlomis brachyodon subsp. damascena
Phlomis brevilabris 
Phlomis bruguieri 
Phlomis chrysophylla 
Phlomis herba-venti 
Phlomis herba-venti subsp. pungens
Phlomis kotschyana 
Phlomis kurdica 
Phlomis longifolia 
Phlomis rigida 
Phlomis syriaca 
Phlomis tathamiorum 
Phlomis viscosa 
Phlomoides laciniata 
Phlomoides molucelloides 
Phoenix dactylifera (introduced)
Phragmites australis subsp. australis
Phragmites australis subsp. isiacus
Phymatoceros bulbiculosus
Physospermum cornubiense
Phytolacca pruinosa 
Picnomon acarna 
Picris amalecitana 
Picris galilaea 
Picris longirostris
Picris rhagadioloides
Picris strigosa 
Pilosella echioides
Pilosella piloselloides subsp. bauhinii
Pilosella piloselloides subsp. magyarica
Pilosella piloselloides subsp. piloselloides
Pilosella procera
Pimpinella corymbosa
Pimpinella cretica
Pimpinella paucidentata
Pimpinella peregrina 
Pimpinella tragium
Pinus brutia var. brutia
Pinus halepensis 
Pinus pinea 
Piptatherum blancheanum 
Piptatherum coerulescens 
Piptatherum holciforme subsp. holciforme
Piptatherum holciforme var. longiglume
Piptatherum molinioides 
Pistacia atlantica 
Pistacia eurycarpa
Pistacia lentiscus 
Pistacia terebinthus
Pistacia vera
Plagiochila porelloides
Plantago afra
Plantago albicans 
Plantago bellardii subsp. bellardii
Plantago bellardii subsp. deflexa
Plantago coronopus
Plantago crassifolia
Plantago cretica
Plantago holosteum
Plantago lagopus 
Plantago lanceolata
Plantago loeflingii
Plantago major
Plantago notata
Plantago sarcophylla
Plantago squarrosa 
Plantago uliginosa
Plantago weldenii
Platanthera bifolia subsp. bifolia
Platanthera chlorantha 
Platanthera holmboei 
Platanus orientalis
Plocama calabrica 
Pluchea dioscoridis
Plumbago europaea
Poa annua 
Poa bulbosa 
Poa chaixii 
Poa compressa 
Poa diversifolia 
Poa hackelii 
Poa infirma 
Poa nemoralis 
Poa pratensis 
Poa sinaica 
Poa sterilis 
Poa timoleontis 
Poa trivialis 
Podonosma orientalis
Podospermum alpigenum
Podospermum canum
Polycarpon succuientum
Polycarpon tetraphyllum
Polygala monspeliaca
Polygala supina
Polygonum arenarium
Polygonum aviculare 
Polygonum bellardii
Polygonum cedrorum 
Polygonum cognatum
Polygonum equisetiforme
Polygonum libani
Polygonum maritimum 
Polygonum polycnemoides
Polygonum setosum
Polypodium cambricum 
Polypodium vulgare subsp. Serratum
Polypogon maritimus 
Polypogon monspeliensis 
Polypogon viridis 
Polystichum aculeatum
Pontechium maculatum
Populus tremula
Porella arboris-vitae
Porella cordaeana
Porella obtusata
Porella platyphylla
Portulaca edulis
Portulaca oleracea
Potamogeton berchtoldii subsp. berchtoldii
Potamogeton crispus 
Potamogeton lucens 
Potamogeton natans 
Potamogeton nodosus 
Potamogeton perfoliatus 
Potamogeton trichoides 
Potentilla geranioides **
Potentilla hirta subsp. laeta 
Potentilla kotschyana
Potentilla libanotica 
Potentilla micrantha
Potentilla reptans 
Potentilla speciosa
Potentilla supina
Poterium gaillardotii 
Poterium sanguisorba
Poterium verrucosum 
Prangos asperula 
Prangos ferulacea
Prangos hermonis
Prasium majus 
Primula acaulis
Prospero autumnale 
Prospero hanburyi 
Prunella laciniata 
Prunella orientalis 
Prunella vulgaris subsp. vulgaris
Prunus arabica
Prunus argentea
Prunus boissieri
Prunus cocomilia
Prunus dulcis
Prunus korschinskii 
Prunus mahaleb 
Prunus microcarpa
Prunus prostrata 
Pseudomuscari inconstrictum 
Pseudopimpinella anthriscoides
Pseudoturritis turrita
Psilurus incurvus 
Psychrogeton nigromontanus
Pteridium aquilinum 
Pteris dentata
Pteris vittata 
Pterocephalus brevis
Pterocephalus plumosus
Pterocephalus pulverulentus
Ptilostemon chamaepeuce 
Ptilostemon diacantha
Puccinellia convoluta 
Puccinellia distans 
Pulicaria arabica
Pulicaria auranitica
Pulicaria dysenterica 
Pulicaria vulgaris
Puschkinia scilloides 
Pycreus flavescens subsp. flavescens
Pycreus flavidus 
Pycreus nitidus 
Pyracantha coccinea
Pyrus bovei
Pyrus syriaca

Q

Quercus brantii
Quercus cerris 
Quercus coccifera 
Quercus ilex 
Quercus infectoria 
Quercus infectoria subsp. veneris
Quercus ithaburensis subsp. ithaburensis
Quercus ithaburensis subsp. macrolepis
Quercus kotschyana 
Quercus libani 
Quercus look 
Quercus macranthera 
Quercus macranthera subsp. syspirensis
Quercus petraea 
Quercus petraea subsp. pinnatiloba
Quercus vulcanica

R

Rachellia obeidus
Radiola linoides 
Radula complanata 
Ranunculus arvensis 
Ranunculus asiaticus 
Ranunculus bulbosus subsp. aleae
Ranunculus chionophilus 
Ranunculus chius 
Ranunculus constantinopolitanus 
Ranunculus cornutus var. scandicinus
Ranunculus cornutus 
Ranunculus damascenus 
Ranunculus demissus 
Ranunculus lateriflorus 
Ranunculus marginatus 
Ranunculus millefoliatus 
Ranunculus millefolius subsp. hierosolymitanus
Ranunculus muricatus 
Ranunculus myosuroides 
Ranunculus neocuneatus 
Ranunculus ophioglossifolius 
Ranunculus orbiculatus 
Ranunculus paludosus subsp. paludosus
Ranunculus peltatus subsp. Sphaerospermus
Ranunculus peyronii 
Ranunculus pinardii 
Ranunculus sceleratus subsp. sceleratus
Ranunculus schweinfurthii. 
Ranunculus sericeus 
Ranunculus trichophyllus subsp. trichophyllus
Reboulia hemisphaerica 
Reichardia intermedia 
Reichardia picroides 
Reichardia tingitana subsp. tingitana
Reseda alba subsp. alba
Reseda decursiva 
Reseda lutea subsp. lutea
Reseda luteola 
Reseda orientalis 
Rhagadiolus edulis 
Rhagadiolus stellatus 
Rhamnus alaternus subsp. alaternus
Rhamnus cathartica 
Rhamnus libanotica
Rhamnus lycioides subsp. Graeca
Rhamnus punctatus 
Rhanteriopsis lanuginosa 
Rhanteriopsis microcephala 
Rhaponticum pygmaeum 
Rheum ribes 
 Rhizocephalus orientalis
Rhododendron ponticum subsp. ponticum
Rhus coriaria 
Ribes orientale 
Riccia bifurca 
Riccia ciliifera 
Riccia crinita 
Riccia crozalsii 
Riccia crustata 
Riccia crystallina 
Riccia glauca 
Riccia gougetiana 
Riccia lamellosa 
Riccia michelii 
Riccia sorocarpa 
Ricotia lunaria 
Ridolfia segetum 
Robinia pseudo-acacia (introduced)
Rochelia cancellata 
Rochelia disperma 
Rochelia persica 
Roemeria hybrida subsp. Dodecandra
Romulea bulbocodium var.  bulbocodium
Romulea bulbocodium var.  crocea
Romulea columnae subsp.  columnae
Romulea nivalis 
Romulea phoenicia 
Romulea ramiflora **
Rorippa macrocarpa 
Rosa canina 
Rosa corymbifera
Rosa micrantha subsp. micrantha
Rosa orientalis
Rosa phoenicia 
Rosa pulverulenta 
Rosa tomentosa 
Rostraria berythea 
Rostraria cristata 
Rostraria obtusiflora 
Rostraria pumila 
Rosularia globulariifolia 
Rosularia libanotica (syn. "Rosularia serrata")
Rosularia sempervivum subsp. Libanotica (syn. Rosularia kesrouanensis)
Rosularia sempervivum subsp. Persica
Rubia rotundifolia 
Rubia tenuifolia subsp.  brachypoda
Rubia tenuifolia subsp.  doniettii
Rubia tenuifolia subsp.  tenuifolia
Rubia tinctorum 
Rubus bifrons 
Rubus canescens 
Rubus collinus 
Rubus sanctus 
Rubus ulmifolius 
Rumex acetosella subsp. acetosella
Rumex acetosella subsp. acetoselloides
Rumex angustifolius subsp. angustifolius
Rumex angustifolius subsp. Libanoticus
Rumex bucephalophorus subsp. bucephalophorus
Rumex chalepensis 
Rumex conglomeratus 
Rumex crispus subsp. crispus
Rumex dentatus subsp. dentatus
Rumex dentatus subsp. mesopotamicus 
Rumex nepalensis 
Rumex occultans 
Rumex patientia subsp. Orientalis
Rumex patientia subsp. patientia
Rumex pulcher subsp. Cassius
Rumex pulcher subsp. pulcher
Rumex pulcher subsp. Woodsii
Rumex pulcher subsp. Anodontus
Rumex sannineus 
Rumex spinosus 
Rumex tuberosus subsp. contractus
Rumex tuberosus subsp. tuberosus
Ruppia maritima 
Ruscus aculeatus 
Ruta chalepensis subsp. chalepensis

S

Sabulina juniperina subsp. Juniperina
Sabulina mediterranea 
Sabulina mesogitana subsp. mesogitana
Sabulina tenuifolia subsp. tenuifolia
Sabulina tenuifolia subsp. turcica  
Sabulina thymifolia 
Sabulina turcomanica 
Saccharum officinarum 
Saccharum ravennae 
Saccharum spontaneum 
Saccharum spontaneum subsp.  aegyptiacum
Saccharum strictum 
Saccobasis polita 
Saccogyna viticulosa
Sageretia thea subsp. thea
Sagina apetala 
Sagina libanotica 
Sagina maritima 
Salix acmophylla 
Salix alba subsp. alba
Salix canariensis)
Salix excelsa 
Salsola kali 
Salvia aramiensis 
Salvia bracteata 
Salvia cassia 
Salvia ceratophylla 
Salvia dominica 
Salvia drusica 
Salvia fairuziana 
Salvia fruticosa 
Salvia hierosolymitana 
Salvia indica 
Salvia judaica 
Salvia lanigera 
Salvia microstegia 
Salvia montbretii 
Salvia multicaulis 
Salvia nazalena 
Salvia palaestina 
Salvia peyronii 
Salvia pinnata 
Salvia rubifolia 
Salvia russellii 
Salvia samuelssonii 
Salvia sclarea 
Salvia spinosa subsp.  spinosa
Salvia spiraeifolia 
Salvia suffruticosa 
Salvia syriaca 
Salvia tomentosa 
Salvia verbenaca 
Salvia virgata 
Salvia viridis 
Salvia viscosa 
Sambucus ebulus subsp. ebulus
Sambucus nigra 
Samolus valerandi subsp. valerandi
Saponaria bargyliana 
Saponaria pumilio 
Saponaria tridentata 
Sarcopoterium spinosum 
Satureja montana 
Satureja montana subsp.  pisidia
Satureja pallaryi 
Satureja thymbra 
Saxifraga cymbalaria subsp. cymbalaria
Saxifraga hederacea var. libanotica 
Saxifraga hederacea 
Saxifraga tridactylites
Scabiosa intermedia 
Scabiosa ochroleuca 
Scabiosa webbiana 
Scaligeria napiformis (syn. Scaligeria cretica)
Scandix australis subsp. grandiflora 
Scandix iberica 
Scandix pecten-veneris subsp. pecten-veneris
Scandix stellata 
Scandix verna 
Scapania aequiloba 
Scapania aspera 
Scapania calcicola
Schenkia spicata 
Schismus arabicus 
Schismus barbatus 
Schoenoplectus litoralis subsp.  litoralis
Schoenoplectus tabernaemontani 
Schoenus nigricans 
Scilla bifolia 
Scilla cilicica 
Scilla hyacinthoides 
Scilla libanotica 
Scilla lucis 
Scilla siberica 
Scilla siberica subsp.  armena
Scirpoides holoschoenus subsp.  holoschoenus
Scleranthus orientalis 
Scleranthus verticillatus 
Sclerochloa dura 
Sclerochloa woronowii 
Scolymus grandiflorus 
Scolymus hispanicus subsp. hispanicus
Scolymus maculatus 
Scorzonera isophylla 
Scorzonera latifolia 
Scorzonera libanotica 
Scorzonera mackmeliana 
Scorzonera mollis subsp. mollis
Scorzonera papposa 
Scorzonera phaeopappa 
Scorzonera psychrophila 
Scorzonera rigida 
Scorzonera scopariiformis 
Scorzonera syriaca
Scrophularia hierochuntina 
Scrophularia hypericifolia 
Scrophularia libanotica subsp. libanotica
Scrophularia peregrina 
Scrophularia peyronii 
Scrophularia rubricaulis 
Scrophularia tagetifolia 
Scrophularia umbrosa subsp. umbrosa
Scrophularia xanthoglossa 
Scrophularia xylorrhiza
Scutellaria albida 
Scutellaria albida subsp.  subsimilis
Scutellaria brevibracteata 
Scutellaria brevibracteata subsp.  subvelutina
Scutellaria diffusa 
Scutellaria heterophylla 
Scutellaria megalaspis 
Scutellaria orientalis 
Scutellaria orientalis subsp.  cretacea
Scutellaria tomentosa 
Scutellaria utriculata 
Secale cereale 
Secale montanum 
Senecio bertramii 
Senecio blanchei 
Senecio doriiformis subsp. doriiformis
Senecio glaucus subsp. coronopifolius 
Senecio glaucus subsp. glaucus
Senecio glaucus 
Senecio leucanthemifolius subsp. leucanthemifolius
Senecio vernalis 
Senecio vulgaris subsp. vulgaris
Serapias orientalis subsp.  levantina
Serapias orientalis subsp.  orientalis
Serapias vomeracea 
Seriphidium sieberi 
Sesamum indicum subsp. indicum
Sesleria alba 
Setaria helvola 
Setaria italica 
Setaria verticillata 
Setaria viridis 
Sherardia arvensis 
Sideritis libanotica subsp.  libanotica
Sideritis libanotica subsp.  linearis
Sideritis libanotica subsp.  microchlamys
Sideritis montana subsp.  montana
Sideritis montana subsp.  remota
Sideritis perfoliata subsp.  perfoliata
Sideritis pullulans 
Sideritis romana 
Sideritis romana subsp.  curvidens
Sideritis syriaca 
Sideritis syriaca subsp.  nusairiensis
Siebera nana 
Siebera pungens
Silene aegyptiaca subsp. aegyptiaca
Silene astartes 
Silene baccifera 
Silene behen 
Silene caryophylloides subsp. stentoria 
Silene cerastoides 
Silene chlorifolia 
Silene colorata subsp. colorata
Silene coniflora 
Silene conoidea 
Silene crassipes 
Silene cretica 
Silene damascena 
Silene dichotoma subsp. racemosa 
Silene dichotoma subsp. dichotoma
Silene fuscata 
Silene gallica 
Silene grisea 
Silene italica subsp. italica
Silene latifolia subsp. alba 
Silene libanotica 
Silene longipetala 
Silene lydia 
Silene macrodonta 
Silene makmeliana 
Silene marschallii subsp. marschallii
Silene microsperma 
Silene modesta 
Silene muscipula subsp. muscipula
Silene nocturna subsp. nocturna
Silene odontopetala subsp. odontopetala
Silene palaestina 
Silene papillosa 
Silene pharnaceifolia 
Silene reinwardtii 
Silene rubella subsp. Rubella
Silene schlumbergeri 
Silene sedoides subsp. sedoides
Silene sefidiana 
Silene siderophila 
Silene stenobotrys 
Silene striata 
Silene succulenta subsp. succulenta
Silene vulgaris subsp. vulgaris (syn. Silene venosa)
Silybum marianum 
Sison exaltatum 
Sisymbrium orientale
Smilax aspera 
Smilax excelsa 
Smyrniopsis syriaca 
Smyrnium connatum 
Smyrnium olusatrum 
Solanum dulcamara 
Solanum villosum 
Solenopsis laurentia 
Solenostoma gracillimum 
Solenostoma hyalinum 
Sonchus glaucescens 
Sonchus oleraceus 
Sonchus tenerrimus subsp. tenerrimus
Sorbus aria 
Sorbus graeca
Sorbus kusnetzovii 
Sorbus torminalis 
Sorbus umbellata subsp. umbellata
Sorbus umbellata subsp. flabellifolia
Sorghum bicolor 
Sorghum halepense 
Sorghum virgatum 
Southbya nigrella 
Southbya tophacea 
Sparganium erectum subsp.  erectum
Spartium junceum 
Spergula arvensis subsp. arvensis
Spergularia bocconei 
Spergularia media subsp. media
Spergularia salina 
Sphaerocarpos michelii 
Sphaerocarpos texanus 
Sphenopus divaricatus 
Spiranthes spiralis 
Spirodela polyrhiza 
Spodiopogon pogonanthus 
Sporobolus ioclados 
Sporobolus pungens 
Sporobolus virginicus 
Stachys annua subsp.  ammophila
Stachys annua subsp.  annua
Stachys arabica 
Stachys arvensis 
Stachys burgsdorffioides subsp.  burgsdorffioides
Stachys cretica 
Stachys cretica subsp.  mersinaea
Stachys cretica subsp.  vacillans
Stachys distans var.  distans
Stachys diversifolia 
Stachys ehrenbergii 
Stachys glandulifera 
Stachys hydrophila 
Stachys iberica subsp.  iberica
Stachys libanotica 
Stachys longispicata 
Stachys neurocalycina 
Stachys nivea (endemic)
Stachys obscura 
Stachys palaestina 
Stachys paneiana 
Stachys pinetorum 
Stachys pumila 
Stachys rupestris 
Stachys saturejoides 
Stachys spectabilis 
Stachys viticina 
Stachys woronowii 
Stellaria apetala 
Stellaria cilicica 
Stellaria media 
Stellaria neglecta subsp. cupaniana 
Stellaria postii 
Steptorhampus tuberosus **
Sternbergia clusiana 
Sternbergia colchiciflora 
Sternbergia lutea 
Sternbergia pulchella 
Sternbergia vernalis 
Stipa arabica 
Stipa barbata 
Stipa capensis 
Stipa ehrenbergiana 
Stipa hohenackeriana 
Stipa holosericea 
Stipa parviflora 
Stipagrostis ciliata 
Stipagrostis lanata 
Stipagrostis obtusa 
Stipagrostis plumosa 
Stipagrostis scoparia 
Stizolophus balsamita 
Struthiopteris spicant 
Stuckenia pectinata 
Styrax officinalis 
Symphytum brachycalyx 
Synelcosciadium carmeli

T

Taeniatherum caput-medusae 
Tamarix gennessarensis
Tamarix hohenackeri 
Tamarix nilotica 
Tamarix smyrnensis 
Tamarix tetragyna 
Tamarix tetrandra 
Tanacetum argenteum subsp. argenteum
Tanacetum argenteum subsp. canum 
Tanacetum aucheri 
Tanacetum cilicium 
Tanacetum densum subsp. densum
Tanacetum parthenium 
Tanacetum praeteritum subsp. praeteritum
Tanacetum tomentellum 
Tanacetum yabrudae 
Taraxacum aleppicum 
Taraxacum apollinis 
Taraxacum assemanii 
Taraxacum bessarabicum 
Taraxacum bithynicum 
Taraxacum brevirostre 
Taraxacum cinnamomeum 
Taraxacum haussknechtii 
Taraxacum kurdiciforme 
Taraxacum laxum 
Taraxacum microcephaloides 
Taraxacum minimum 
Taraxacum officinale 
Taraxacum phaleratum 
Taraxacum serotinum 
Taraxacum sonchoides 
Taraxacum syriacum 
Targionia hypophylla 
Targionia lorbeeriana 
Telephium imperati subsp. orientale 
Tetrapogon villosus 
Teucrium antilibanoticum 
Teucrium capitatum 
Teucrium capitatum subsp.  capitatum 
Teucrium chamaedrys 
Teucrium chamaedrys subsp.  tauricola 
Teucrium coniortodes 
Teucrium creticum 
Teucrium divaricatum subsp.  divaricatum 
Teucrium divaricatum subsp.  graecum 
Teucrium haradjanii 
Teucrium heterotrichum 
Teucrium montbretii subsp.  libanoticum 
Teucrium montbretii subsp.  montbretii 
Teucrium multicaule subsp.  multicaule 
Teucrium multicaule subsp.  planifolium 
Teucrium oliverianum 
Teucrium orientale var.  orientale 
Teucrium paederotoides 
Teucrium parviflorum 
Teucrium procerum 
Teucrium pruinosum 
Teucrium rigidum 
Teucrium scordium subsp.  scordioides 
Teucrium scordium subsp.  scordium 
Teucrium socinianum 
Teucrium spinosum 
Teucrium stachyophyllum 
Thalictrum isopyroides 
Thalictrum orientale 
Theligonum cynocrambe 
Themeda quadrivalvis 
Themeda triandra 
Thesium arvense 
Thesium bergeri 
Thesium billardieri 
Thesium humile 
Thinopyrum elongatum 
Thinopyrum intermedium 
Thinopyrum junceum 
Thlaspi kotschyanum (syn. Thlaspi brevicaule 
Thuspeinanta persica 
Thymbra capitata 
Thymbra spicata subsp.  spicata 
Thymelaea aucheri 
Thymelaea gussonei 
Thymelaea hirsuta 
Thymelaea passerina 
Thymus alfredae 
Thymus cilicicus 
Thymus eigii 
Thymus kotschyanus subsp.  kotschyanus 
Thymus leucotrichus subsp.  leucotrichus 
Thymus syriacus var.  syriacus 
Tolpis umbellata 
Tolpis virgata subsp. virgata
Tordylium aegyptiacum 
Tordylium cordatum
Tordylium syriacum
Tordylium trachycarpa
Torilis africana
Torilis arvensis subsp. arvensis
Torilis chrysocarpa 
Torilis leptophylla var. erythrotricha
Torilis nodosa subsp. nodosa
Torilis trichosperma 
Tragopogon buphthalmoides 
Tragopogon porrifolius subsp. longirostris 
Tragopogon pterocarpus 
Tribulus terrestris 
Tricholaena teneriffae 
Trifolium angustifolium 
Trifolium arvense 
Trifolium billardieri
Trifolium boissieri 
Trifolium campestre 
Trifolium clusii 
Trifolium clypeatum 
Trifolium formosum 
Trifolium fragiferum 
Trifolium globosum 
Trifolium lagrangei 
Trifolium lappaceum 
Trifolium pauciflorum
Trifolium physodes 
Trifolium pilulare 
Trifolium purpureum 
Trifolium repens 
Trifolium resupinatum 
Trifolium sannineum 
Trifolium scabrum 
Trifolium speciosum
Trifolium stellatum 
Trifolium tomentosum 
Trifolium xerocephalum
Trigonella berythea 
Trigonella cylindracea
Trigonella filipes 
Trigonella spinosa 
Tripleurospermum auriculatum 
Tripleurospermum caucasicum 
Tripleurospermum sannineum 
Trisetaria glumacea 
Trisetaria koelerioides 
Trisetaria linearis 
Trisetaria loeflingiana 
Trisetum flavescens 
Triticum compactum 
Triticum dicoccoides 
Triticum monococcum subsp.  aegilopoides 
Triticum turgidum subsp.  dicoccum 
Triticum turgidum subsp.  durum 
Triticum urartu
Tuberaria guttata subsp. guttata
Tulipa agenensis 
Tulipa aleppensis 
Tulipa aucheriana 
Tulipa biflora 
Tulipa humilis 
Tulipa julia 
Tulipa montana 
Tulipa systola 
Turgenia latifolia 
Turgeniopsis foeniculacea 
Tussilago farfara 
Typha angustifolia 
Typha domingensis 
Typha latifolia 
Tyrimnus leucographus

U

Ulmus minor subsp. minor
Umbilicus erectus
Umbilicus horizontalis
Umbilicus horizontalis var. intermedius
Umbilicus rupestris
Urospermum picroides
Urginea maritima
Urtica dioica 
Urtica fragilis
Urtica membranacea
Urtica pilulifera
Urtica urens

V

Vaccaria grandiflora 
Vaccaria hispanica 
Vaccaria liniflora 
Vaccaria oxyodonta 
Vachellia farnesiana 
Vagaria parviflora 
Valantia hispida var.  eburnea
Valantia hispida var.  hispida
Valantia muralis var.  muralis
Valeriana dioscoridis 
Valerianella antilibanotica 
Valerianella carinata 
Valerianella coronata 
Valerianella dactylophylla 
Valerianella discoidea 
Valerianella echinata 
Valerianella eriocarpa 
Valerianella kotschyi 
Valerianella obtusiloba 
Valerianella orientalis 
Valerianella oxyrrhyncha 
Valerianella szovitsiana 
Valerianella tuberculata 
Valerianella vesicaria 
Vallisneria spiralis 
Velezia fasciculata 
Velezia rigida 
Ventenata blanchei 
Ventenata macra 
Verbascum agrimoniifolium subsp. agrimoniifolium
Verbascum aliciae 
Verbascum antilibanoticum 
Verbascum antiochium 
Verbascum berytheum 
Verbascum blancheanum 
Verbascum caesareum 
Verbascum cedreti 
Verbascum damascenum 
Verbascum gaillardotii 
Verbascum galilaeum 
Verbascum geminiflorum 
Verbascum leptostachyum 
Verbascum levanticum 
Verbascum libanoticum 
Verbascum oreophilum 
Verbascum orientale subsp. orientale
Verbascum porteri 
Verbascum ptychophyllum 
Verbascum qulebicum 
Verbascum sinaiticum 
Verbascum sinuatum 
Verbascum tiberiadis 
Verbascum tripolitanum 
Verbascum tropidocarpum 
Verbena supina 
Veronica anagallis-aquatica subsp. anagallis-aquatica
Veronica anagallis-aquatica subsp. lysimachioides 
Veronica anagalloides subsp. anagalloides
Veronica anagalloides subsp. heureka 
Veronica arvensis 
Veronica beccabunga subsp. abscondita
Veronica beccabunga subsp. beccabunga
Veronica biloba 
Veronica bombycina 
Veronica caespitosa subsp. leiophylla
Veronica campylopoda 
Veronica cymbalaria 
Veronica hederifolia 
Veronica hispidula 
Veronica leiocarpa 
Veronica macrostachya 
Veronica michauxii 
Veronica orientalis 
Veronica panormitana subsp. Bardostensis
Veronica persica 
Veronica polifolia 
Veronica polita 
Veronica pusilla 
Veronica reuterana 
Veronica scardica 
Veronica syriaca 
Veronica triloba 
Veronica triphyllos 
Veronica viscosa 
Viburnum tinus 
Vicia canescens 
Vicia cuspidata 
Vicia narbonensis 
Vicia peregrina 
Vicia tenuifolia 
Vinca herbacea 
Vinca herbacea subsp. libanotica
Vinca major 
Vincetoxicum canescens 
Vincetoxicum dionysiense 
Viola heldreichiana 
Viola libanotica 
Viola modesta 
Viola occulta 
Viola odorata 
Viola parvula 
Viola pentadactyla 
Viola sieheana 
Viscum album 
Visnaga daucoides 
Vitex agnus-castus 
Vulpia brevis 
Vulpia bromoides 
Vulpia ciliata 
Vulpia fasciculata 
Vulpia membranacea 
Vulpia muralis 
Vulpia myuros 
Vulpia pectinella 
Vulpia persica 
Vulpia unilateralis

W
Washingtonia filifera (introduced)
Withania somnifera subsp. somnifera
Wolffia arrhiza

X

Xanthium echinatum (introduced) 
Xanthium spinosum (introduced) 
Xanthium strumarium (introduced) 
Xeranthemum cylindraceum 
Xeranthemum inapertum 
Xeranthemum longipapposum

Z

References

 
Flora of Western Asia
Natural history of Lebanon